Sarah Melanie Jean Kilburn is an English actress, known for portraying the role of Laura Bryant in the ITV police drama series The Bill. She also played the part of Sandra Conway, wife of CI Derek Conway in earlier episodes of The Bill. Her career began in 1983 when she starred as Maureen in The Company Car. She played Eve Elliot in Coronation Street in 2001. However, after other smaller roles such as playing Jill in Making Out, Kilburn rose to prominence in 1991 playing the role of Carol Anderson in Soldier Soldier.

Kilburn had other regular television and theatre roles. She starred as Sandra in Where the Heart Is throughout 1999, and also played the regular role of Liz in Peak Practice during the series which aired in 2000. From 2017 to 2018, Kilburn appeared as Reverend Irene Mills in the BBC soap opera EastEnders. In 2021, she appeared in an episode of the BBC soap opera Doctors as Mavis Gregg.

References

External links
 

Living people
English soap opera actresses
1956 births
People educated at Bradford Girls' Grammar School
Actresses from Bradford